Balderstone Technology College was a school in the Balderstone district of the Metropolitan Borough of Rochdale in Greater Manchester, England.

Location
It is situated near the junction of Queensway (A664) and Oldham Road (A671) between Balderstone and Kirkholt. It is in the parish of St Mary, Balderstone.

History

Grammar school
The school was once called Rochdale Grammar School for Boys, formerly known as Rochdale Municipal High School for Boys on Church Lane. It was administered by Rochdale Education Committee, and moved to Queen Victoria Street in 1953 at a cost of £180,000. A grammar school had been founded in 1565 in Rochdale by Matthew Parker, then Archbishop of Canterbury. There was also Rochdale Grammar School for Girls on Falinge Road, becoming Falinge Park High School.

Comprehensive
It became a comprehensive in 1969 - the Balderstone High School, then Balderstone Community School in 1972 for boys and girls aged 14–18. In 1992 it became a high school for boys and girls aged 11–16. In 1999 it gained Technology College status.

The school closed on 31 August 2010 as a result of the Building Schools for the Future program. The school merged with Springhill High School and formed a new school called Kingsway Park High School. The building was used to host Kingsway Park High School until 2012 when a new building was built on the former Springhill High School site, Turfhill Road.

Alumni
 Fusilier Conrad Cole, youngest British soldier to die in the Gulf War on 26 February 1991 aged 17, when nine British soldiers of the 3rd Battalion of the Royal Regiment of Fusiliers were killed by an American missile fired from an A-10 which hit a Warrior tracked armoured vehicle.

Rochdale Grammar School
 James Diggle, Professor of Greek and Latin at Queens' College, University of Cambridge since 1995
 Sir Leslie Fowden, Professor of Plant Science from 1964–73 at University College London, and Director from 1973–86 of the Rothamsted Experimental Station, discovered two plant amino acids (one being methyleneglutamine) not part of proteins, and became a world authority on plant amino acids 
 Glynn Boyd Harte, artist 
 Sir Peter Ogden, businessman who founded Computacenter in 1981 and Dealogic in 1983
 Sir Joseph Pilling, KCB, Identity Commissioner since 2009, and Director General from 1991–92 of HM Prison Service
 Cyril Smith MP

References

External links
 EduBase

Educational institutions established in 1953
Defunct schools in the Metropolitan Borough of Rochdale
1953 establishments in England
Educational institutions disestablished in 2010
2010 disestablishments in England